Athenæum Press is an historic building located at 215 First Street in Cambridge, Massachusetts. The structure occupies the entire block between First Street, Second Street, Athenæum Street, and Linskey Way, which was formerly known as Munroe Street. Topped by a statue of Athena sculpted by Adio diBiccari, the building is visible from the nearby Charles River and the Longfellow Bridge.

History

The Athenæum Press was designed by the architecture firm, Lockwood, Greene, and Company, with tile vaults designed by the Guastavino Company. The building was completed in 1895. The structure was built for Edwin Ginn and Ginn & Company, owners of The Athenæum Press, to house its printing operations, and was built using principles of late nineteenth-century textile mill construction. Due to its highly visible location, the building was given a number of stylistic embellishments, including a large sculpture of Athena designed by Adio diBiccari. The front of the building resembles an Ancient Greek temple implemented in brick, patinated copper, and glass. The building was listed on the National Register of Historic Places in 1982. The building was the third major printing house built in Cambridge (after those of Harvard University Press and Riverside Press), and one of the first major industrial sites on Cambridge's riverfront.

The building has  of floor space and was renovated circa 2005.  The facility was used for many years to print textbooks.  Ginn & Company later became part of Pearson Education.

As of 2019, occupants include the Cambridge Athletic Club, Partners HealthCare Innovation, the Lean Enterprise Institute, SAGE Therapeutics, Constellation Pharmaceuticals and several other small businesses.

See also
National Register of Historic Places listings in Cambridge, Massachusetts

References

External links
 Souvenir of the Athenaeum Press by Ginn and Company, 1903.  A 24-page book with descriptions and photographs, available for free download.
 Silent movie showcasing printing activities in the building in 1925.  Moviecraft archive.

Commercial buildings completed in 1895
Industrial buildings and structures on the National Register of Historic Places in Massachusetts
Buildings and structures in Cambridge, Massachusetts
National Register of Historic Places in Cambridge, Massachusetts